Sebastian Strasser is a German director of commercials and films. Strasser has received more than 200 international advertising awards. 
For example:  16 Lions in Cannes, multiple Gold at the London IAA, New York Film Festival, D&AD, Eurobest European Advertising Festival, One Show,  Clio Awards, Montreux, etc. 
He won Gold at the D&AD Awards for the best Direction in France 2010, Gold at the German Advertising Festival (DWP) for the best Direction in Germany 2011,  Graffite for the best direction at the London D&AD Awards 2019, Gold for direction at London International Awards 2019, Gold for direction at Cyclope Berlin 2019, and numerous Art Directors Club (ADC) awards worldwide. 
Strasser was ranked 13th in the Gunn Report’s Most Awarded Directors in the World, and his spot "Kids on Steps" for Volkswagen was elected among the 20 best commercials of the 21st century by the Gunn Report in 2015. His first short film, Happy End, premiered at Berlinale Filmfestival in 2005. The latest short, Apparat, finished post-production in November 2019. His drama television series Darklands, is currently in development with Warner Brothers and Ratpack Films (writers room) and is estimated to start production in 2021.

Life
The parents and grandparents of Sebastian Strasser were stage actors. By the age of 6, the young actor was taking part in stage productions and motion pictures. He completed his Abitur at the German Goethe College in Bucharest. 
From 1992-1996, he studied Journalism at the, German Sport University Cologne and Cinematic Art at the Academy of Media Arts Cologne.
After his study at the Academy of Media Arts, he worked at the first German broadcast station (ARD) as an author and journalist for a famous German political broadcasting show, (Zak / "Privatfernsehen" with Friedrich Küppersbusch). 

In 2000, Sebastian moved into commercial directing, becoming the highest awarded director in Germany and one of the most awarded directors worldwide. 

In 2005 his first short film, Happy End (with Matthias Schweighöfer and Katharina Schüttler), was shown at the Berlinale film festival. 

In 2016 Sebastian and his producing partner Christiane Dressler founded ANORAK, a Berlin-based production company, that ranked Nr. 1 in the creative ranking of the best production company in all years since foundation.

In 2016 Sebastian moved with his family to Los Angeles, where he is represented by Reset Content; his agents for film and television are at UTA: United Talent Agency.

In fall 2018, his dystopian series Darklands was picked up by Warner Brothers and is currently in development (writers room). The eight-episode drama television series, for which Sebastian signs as creator, writer, director and showrunner, is being co-written by Bernd Lange and produced by Ratpack Films.

In 2019 he wrote and directed Apparat: 15 min. short film, starring Ulrich Thomsen and Ayelet Zurer, with cinematography by Rodrigo Prieto. The film is produced by Radical Media and The Mill.

Works

Selected awards

References

 Un român la Hollywood: e „coleg” cu Angelina Jolie și Anthony Hopkins, și își va lansa, la anul, primul film

External links
 
 
 Biography Filmportal
 Artist Network
 Sebastian Strasser at RESET
 Sebastian Strasser at Stink
 Sebastian Strasser at Anorak Film

1972 births
Living people
German film directors
People from Sibiu